Louis Paul Abeille FRS (3 June 1719 – 28 July 1807 Paris) was a French economist.
 
He was Inspector General of Manufactures and Commerce in 1765, and secretary of commerce from 1769 to 1783, when he was replaced by his son, Jean Louis. 
He was also a member of the Agricultural Society of Paris.

Works
Réflexions sur la police des grains en France et en Angleterre, 1764
Principes sur la liberté du commerce des grains, Desaint, 1768
Faits qui ont influé sur la cherté des grains en France et en Angleterre,  1768
Observations de la société royale d'agriculture, sur l'uniformité des poids et mesures, Louis-Paul Abeille, Mathieu Tillet, 1790

References

French economists
1719 births
1807 deaths
Fellows of the Royal Society